Four Four South Village, or Forty-Four South Village was previously a residential area in Taipei for the military personnel of the 44th Arsenal of the Combined Logistics Command and their dependents. Today it has been partially renovated and is home to model homes from its original use, cultural and creative stores, a restaurant, and occasional arts and crafts markets.

See also
 Four Four West Village

Neighbourhoods in Taipei
Military of the Republic of China
Military dependents' village, Taiwan